Aditi Deshmukh ( Ghorpade); known professionally as Aditi Pratap is a former Indian actress who worked in Hindi television. She made her acting debut with Koshish - Ek Aashaa and is best known for her roles in Hatim and Saat Phere: Saloni Ka Safar. Aditi is married to Congress politician and MLA Amit Deshmukh.

Personal life
Aditi was born as Aditi Ghorpade in a Marathi family in Pune, Maharashtra. She was raised in Bangalore and Delhi.

Aditi married Congress politician and MLA Amit Deshmukh, son of former chief minister of Maharashtra, Vilasrao Deshmukh on 28 February 2008. The couple have two sons named Avir and Avan.

Career
Pratap made her acting debut in 2000 with Koshish - Ek Aashaa. From 2001 to 2002, she played Sahiba in Maan. Pratap then played Princess Sunayna in Hatim opposite Romiit Raaj, from 2003 to 2004. From 2004 to 2005, she played Leena in Hey...Yehii To Haii Woh!. 

Pratap played Aditi Singh opposite Ashish Kapoor in Saat Phere: Saloni Ka Safar from 2005 to 2007. In 2006, she made her film debut with Banaras: A Mystic Love Story, where she played Anjali. From 2006 to 2007, she played a role in Risshton Ki Dor, which marked her last screen appearance.

Philanthrophy
Deshmukh is a philanthropist and social entrepreneur. She is the founder of a farm-to-table venture, 21 Organic. She is also the co-founder of Namaskar Ayurved. 

As the executive trustee of the Vilasrao Deshmukh Foundation, she is helping 26 villages in Latur become sustainable, through various initiatives. Deshmukh is involved in the development of women, children, the environment and Indian culture. She is also the Head of Goldcrest Group of Schools.

Filmography

Films

Television

References

External links
 

Indian television actresses
Living people
Year of birth missing (living people)